Cannabis in Hong Kong is illegal. The possession, sale, transportation, and cultivation of cannabis is prohibited under the Dangerous Drug Ordinance (Chapter 134 of the Law of Hong Kong), which was put into effect at January 17, 1969, during the British colonial period.

Legality 
Cannabis is listed as a Schedule 1 drug prohibited by the Dangerous Drug Ordinance, alongside others like heroin, opium, cocaine and methamphetamine. The offenses, and the maximum penalties associated with each offense, are listed below:

Legal treatment of cannabis trafficking 
"Trafficking" is defined in the Dangerous Drug Ordinance as:"...importing into Hong Kong, exporting from Hong Kong, procuring, supplying or otherwise dealing in or with the dangerous drug, or possessing the dangerous drug for the purpose of trafficking..."To set the length for each particular sentence, judges may look to previous cases where sentence minimums—known as tariffs—were applied, and use them as guidelines. The principal tariffs for distributing cannabis resin were suggested in Attorney-General v Chan Chi-man ([1987]  HKLR  221), where it was noted that sentences should be scaled down appropriately based on the type of cannabis product being trafficked (i.e. the penalties are reduced if the product contains smaller amounts of tetrahydrocannabinol, or THC):

Other details in the case are also used to make judgments. In HKSAR v Chor Lui ([2001] 3 HKLRD 95), where the accused pleaded guilty to distributing 0.24g of herbal cannabis in a discotheque, the Court of First Instance scaled back the sentence to two months due to the amount of cannabis distributed, its lack of potency compared to cannabis resin, and in exchange for a "guilty" plea. However, the Magistrate dismissed the ability to appeal the sentence, under grounds of location and social context—the accused was selling cannabis in a place "where impressionable young people congregated, and was preying on their credibility".

While the court tends to reduce the initial sentence based on cannabis potency and amount, it acknowledges that any role in the trafficking of a Schedule 1 drug should be taken seriously. For example, in R v Chan Shu Tong ([1996] 4 HKC 515), the accused admitted to storing 790 kg of cannabis being trafficked in a rented flat, under orders from his employer. From a starting point of 30 years, the judge settled on a sentence of 18 years for the accused. During the appeal process, the Court of Appeal upheld the original decision, stating that while the accused did not benefit from the trafficking operation, their participation in storing the cannabis was still significant.

Legality of Cannabinoids 

Schedule 1 lists THC illegal. CBD is also illegal in Hong Kong.

Usage and attitudes 
While using and growing cannabis remains illegal, there have been reports of greater cannabis arrests and seizures over the years. In 2016, cannabis seizures by Hong Kong police increased by over 95% to 255 kg, up from 130 kg in 2015. According to the Narcotics Division of the Security Bureau, in 2016, cannabis was reported to be used by 5% of all psychotropic substance abusers in Hong Kong.

The first cannabis investment symposium in Hong Kong was held in November 2018 targeting new cannabis investment opportunities for Hong Kong investors in an emerging new industry with the support of the HKSAR government.

There have also been reports of synthetic cannabinoid usage in Hong Kong, which was not common before 2010.

References

External links 

 Official e-Legislation of Chapter 134 - Dangerous Drugs Ordinance

Hong Kong
Hong Kong society
Politics of Hong Kong